The sixth Asian Championships in Athletics were held in September 1985 at the Senayan Madya Stadium in Jakarta, Indonesia.

Medal summary

Men's events

Women's events

Medal table

See also
 1985 in athletics (track and field)

External links
 GBR Athletics

Asian Athletics Championships
Asian Athletics Championships
Asian Athletics Championships
International athletics competitions hosted by Indonesia
Asian Championships in Athletics
Asian Championships in Athletics